The Dead One may refer to:

The Dead Ones, a 1948 film created by director Gregory Markopoulos
The Dead One (1961 film), a 1961 independent film
The Dead One (2007 film), a 2007 film by Brian Cox
"The Dead One", a song by Insane Clown Posse from their album Ringmaster
Cerro El Muerto or The Dead One Hill, a mountain peak in the Andes

See also
El Muerto (disambiguation)
Death (personification)